Saint Thomas or St. Thomas may refer to:

People 
 Thomas the Apostle (died AD 72), Jewish-Christian Apostle and Saint of the 1st century
 Thomas the Hermit, Coptic Desert Father and Saint of the 4th century
 Thomas of Maurienne or Thomas of Farfa Abbey (died 720), the first abbot of the Abbey of Farfa
 Thomas Becket (died 1170), also called Saint Thomas of Canterbury and Saint Thomas the Martyr
 Thomas Aquinas (1225–1274), Catholic philosopher and theologian
 Thomas Cantilupe, or Thomas of Hereford (died 1282)
 Thomas of Dover or Thomas Hales (died 1295), martyr
 Thomas of Tolentino (died 1321), martyred in India
 Thomas of Lancaster (1278–1322), venerated as a saint after his execution
 Thomas of Villanova (1488–1555), Spanish friar of the Order of Saint Augustine, writer, archbishop
 Thomas More (1478–1535), English lawyer, philosopher, author, statesman
 Thomas Danki (died 1597), see Saints Paul Miki and Companions
 Thomas Kozaki (died 1597), see Saints Paul Miki and Companions
 Thomas Garnet (died 1608), Jesuit priest who was executed in London
 Thomas De Van Nguyen (died 1839), of the Vietnamese Martyrs
 Thomas Du Viet Dinh (died 1839), of the Vietnamese Martyrs
 Thomas Thien Tran (died 1838), of the Vietnamese Martyrs
 Thomas Toan, of the Vietnamese Martyrs
 Thomas Khuong, of the Vietnamese Martyrs

Places

Canada
 St. Thomas, Newfoundland and Labrador, Canada
 St. Thomas, Ontario, Canada
 Saint-Thomas, Quebec, Canada
 Saint-Thomas-Didyme, Quebec, Canada
 Saint-Thomas-d'Aquin, former municipality now part of Saint-Hyacinthe, Quebec, Canada
 Saint-Thomas-de-Pierreville, former municipality now part of Pierreville, Quebec, Canada

France
 Saint-Thomas, Aisne, France
 Saint-Thomas, Haute-Garonne, France

United Kingdom
 St Thomas, Exeter, United Kingdom
 St Thomas, Swansea, United Kingdom
 St. Thomas (electoral ward), Swansea, Wales
 St Thomas the Apostle Rural, a civil parish in Cornwall, United Kingdom

United States
 Saint Thomas, Indiana, an unincorporated community
 St. Thomas, Minnesota
 St. Thomas, Missouri
 St. Thomas, Nevada, a sunken town
 St. Thomas, North Dakota
 St. Thomas Township, Pennsylvania
 Saint Thomas, U.S. Virgin Islands, an island in the Caribbean Sea
Saint Thomas (Brandenburg colony), a former settlement on this island

West Indies region
 Saint Thomas, Barbados
 Saint Thomas Parish, Jamaica, once known as Saint Thomas in the East
 Saint Thomas, U.S. Virgin Islands

Venezuela
 St Thomas de Guyana, or St Thomas of Oronoque, is today Ciudad Bolívar on the Orinoco River

Elsewhere
 St. Thomas Island, Bulgaria
 St. Thomas Mount, a hillock in Chennai, India where, according to tradition, the biblical Thomas the Apostle was killed
 St. Thomas (County Dublin), a civil parish incorporating Jobstown, Ireland
 San Tomás (St. Thomas), former name of San Benedicto Island, Mexico
 São Tomé (St. Thomas), an island in São Tomé and Príncipe
 Saint Thomas's Gate, also known as Bab Tuma, a district of Damascus, Syria

Institutions

India
 St. Thomas College, Bhilai, Bhilai, Chhattisgarh, India
 St. Thomas College, Kozhencherry, Kozhencherry, Kerala, India
 St Thomas College of Engineering and Technology, Kannur, Kerala, India
 St. Thomas College, Palai, Kerala, India
 St. Thomas College, Thrissur, Kerala, India
 St. Thomas' College, Dehradun, secondary school in Dehradun, Uttarakhand, India
 St. Thomas Higher Secondary School, Kozhencherry, Kerala, India

Sri Lanka
 S. Thomas' College, Bandarawela, Sri Lanka
 S. Thomas' College, Gurutalawa, Sri Lanka
 St. Thomas' College, Kotte, Sri Lanka
 St. Thomas' College, Matale, Sri Lanka
 St. Thomas' College, Matara, Sri Lanka
 S. Thomas' College, Mount Lavinia, Sri Lanka
 S. Thomas' Preparatory School, Kollupitiya, Sri Lanka

United States
 Saint Thomas Academy, a high school in Minnesota
 Saint Thomas Choir School, New York, New York
 St. Thomas University (Florida), Miami, Florida
 St. Thomas University School of Law, Miami, Florida
 St. Thomas' Episcopal School, Houston, TX
 University of Scranton, Scranton, Pennsylvania, founded in 1888 as St. Thomas College, renamed in 1938
 University of St. Thomas (Minnesota), St. Paul, Minnesota
 University of St. Thomas (Texas) Houston, Texas

Music 
 "St. Thomas" (song), a jazz composition by saxophonist Sonny Rollins
 St. Thomas: Tribute to Great Tenors, a 1991 album by the New York Unit
 Thomas Hansen (musician) (1976–2007), Norwegian musician who performed under the name Saint Thomas
 A hymn composed by Aaron Williams

Other uses

 Saint Thomas Christians, an ancient community of Christians from Kerala, India
 St Thomas' Hospital, Southwark
 St. Thomas University (New Brunswick), Fredericton, New Brunswick, Canada
 Thomasleeha or St. Thomas, a 1975 Malayalam historical film about Thomas the Apostle in India

See also 
 Santo Tomas (disambiguation)
 St. Thomas' Church (disambiguation)
 St. Thomas Hospital (disambiguation)
 St. Thomas station (disambiguation)